Parole Fixer is a 1940 American crime film directed by Robert Florey.

Federal Bureau of Investigation Director J. Edgar Hoover is credited for the source material, the 1938 book called Persons in Hiding, a purported expose of corruption within the parole system.  The plot focuses on the gangster "Big Boy" Bradmore (Quinn) who is wrongly paroled from prison and promptly murders an FBI agent.

Cast
 William Henry as Scott Britton
 Virginia Dale as Enid Casserly
 Robert Paige as Steve Eddson
 Gertrude Michael as Collette Menthe
 Richard Denning as Bruce Eaton
 Fay Helm as Rita Mattison
 Anthony Quinn as Francis 'Big Boy' Bradmore
 Harvey Stephens as Bartley Hanford
 Marjorie Gateson as Mrs. Thorton Casserly
 Lyle Talbot as Ross Waring
 Louise Beavers as Aunt Lindy
 Paul McGrath as Tyler Craden
 Jack Carson as George Mattison

External links 
 

1940 films
Films directed by Robert Florey
Paramount Pictures films
1940 crime drama films
American crime drama films
American black-and-white films
1940s American films
1940s English-language films